Undrajavaram mandal is one of the 19 mandals in East Godavari district of the Indian state of Andhra Pradesh having population of 37,774 as of 2011 census. It is administered under Kovvur revenue division and its headquarters are located at Undrajavaram.

Towns and villages 

 census, the mandal has 15 settlements. Undrajavaram is the most populated and Dammennu is the least populated village in the mandal.

The settlements in the mandal are listed below:

See also 
East Godavari district

References

Mandals in East Godavari district